John Chard Humphrey Lancelot Hollins (3 June 1890 – 13 November 1938) was an English cricketer active from 1914 to 1921 who played for Lancashire. He was born in Preston and died in Whittle-le-Woods. He appeared in 20 first-class matches as a righthanded batsman. He scored 454 runs with a highest score of 65 and held ten catches. He took one wicket with a best analysis of one for 45.

Notes

1890 births
1938 deaths
English cricketers
Lancashire cricketers
Younger sons of baronets